Angelidis, is a Greek surname. Notable people with the surname include:

 Dinos Angelidis (born 1969), Greek basketball player of mixed Greek-Austrian ancestry
 Mike Angelidis (born 1985), Canadian ice hockey player of Macedonian descent

See also
 Angelides

Greek-language surnames